is the 25th single by Japanese idol group Nogizaka46. The single was released on 25 March 2020.

The center position of the title track was held by Mai Shiraishi. This single was intended to be the last one that Shiraishi performs in before she leaves  Nogizaka46, and as such was written as a tribute to her; however, she delayed her graduation due to the COVID-19 pandemic and was present in "Sekaijū no Rinjin yo", the next song released. Shiraishi also wrote and performed solo the Type-A coupling song , marking the first time someone other than Yasushi Akimoto has written a song for Nogizaka46.

Release 
This single will be released in 5 versions. Type-A, Type-B, Type-C, Type-D and a regular edition.

Track listing

Type-A

Type-B

Type-C

Type-D

Regular Edition

Special Edition

Participating members

"Shiawase no Hogoshoku" 
Mai Shiraishi holds the center position. Additionally, all first generation members are chosen to perform in this song.
 Third row: Haruka Kaki, Mai Shinuchi, Mizuki Yamashita, Shiori Kubo, Miona Hori, Momoko Ōzono, Sakura Endo, Renka Iwamoto, Yūki Yoda, Hinako Kitano, Minami Umezawa
 Second row: Sayuri Inoue, Maaya Wada, Kazumi Takayama, Manatsu Akimoto, Hina Higuchi, Kana Nakada
 First row: Asuka Saitō, Erika Ikuta, Mai Shiraishi, Sayuri Matsumura, Minami Hoshino

"Sayonara Stay With Me" 
Manatsu Akimoto, Erika Ikuta, Asuka Saitō, Sayuri Matsumura, Shiori Kubo, Yūki Yoda, Sakura Endo, Haruka Kaki

"Jyāne" 
Mai Shiraishi

"Anastasia" 
All second generation members

"Mainichi ga Brand New Day 
All third generation members

"I see" 
All fourth generation members

"Fantastic Sanshoku Pan" 
Asuka Saitō, Minami Umezawa, Mizuki Yamashita

Charts

Weekly charts

Year-end charts

Certifications

References

2020 singles
2020 songs
Japanese-language songs
Nogizaka46 songs
Oricon Weekly number-one singles
Billboard Japan Hot 100 number-one singles
Songs with lyrics by Yasushi Akimoto